Calhoun Academy may refer to:

Calhoun Academy (Mississippi), a private school in Pittsboro, Mississippi
Calhoun Academy (South Carolina), a private school in St. Matthews, South Carolina
John C. Calhoun Academy, a private school in Walterboro, South Carolina now known as Colleton Preparatory Academy